Le Formentor is a high-rise residential building in Monaco.

Location
It is located at 27 Avenue Princesse Grace in the Larvotto district of Monaco.

History
The construction of the building was completed in 1981. It was built by the Monegasque construction firm, J. B. Pastor et fils. It is owned by the Groupe Pastor, whose offices are located in the building. It is 27-storey high, at 78.00 metre. It was built in concrete in the modernist architectural style.

Monaco Modern’Art, an art gallery, is located in the building. The consulate of Uruguay in Monaco is also located in Le Formentor.

Notable residents
Victor Hervey, 6th Marquess of Bristol (apartment 1E)
Novak Djokovic

References

Residential skyscrapers in Monaco
Modernist architecture in Monaco
Buildings and structures completed in 1981
Pastor family